Ada Kaleh (from , meaning "Island Fortress";  or ; Serbian and Bulgarian: Адакале,  Adakale) was a small island on the Danube, in what is now Romania, that was submerged during the construction of the Iron Gates hydroelectric plant in 1970. Ada Kaleh was inhabited by Turkish Muslims from all parts of the Ottoman Empire, and there were also family ties to the Turkish Muslim populations of Vidin and Ruse, Bulgaria due to exogamic marriages.

The isle of Ada Kaleh is probably the most evocative victim of the Iron Gate dam's construction. Once an Ottoman Turkish exclave that changed hands multiple times in the 18th and 19th centuries, it had a mosque and numerous twisting alleys, and was known as a free port and a smuggler's nest. The islanders produced Turkish delight, baklava, rose water, fig and rose marmalade, and rose oil, and were well-known for Turkish oil wrestling. The existence of Ada Kaleh was overlooked at the 1878 Congress of Berlin peace talks surrounding the Russo-Turkish War, known in Romania as the War of Independence, which allowed the island to remain a de jure possession of the Ottoman Sultan until 1923.

Turkish population 
Adakale Turks. The settlement of Turks began in 1699 when the Ottoman Empire took the island.
In an Ottoman archive document, a brief history of the island and its inhabitants are described as follows: “After the 1770s, no boats crossed the Danube, presumably, and the Sipahi officers, who were under the command of an Ottoman pasha in Adakale, brought their families to Adakale. The people here are all descendants of these military families… This is why the native language of the people is Turkish.” 
In 1830, when the Serbian Principality was established in the territory of the Sanjak of Smederevo of the Ottoman Empire, the crowded Turks in Serbia community living in the Principality of Serbia was settled in 6 settlements that would be considered Ottoman lands. Adakale became one of these six Turkish quarters, each of which was considered a township. 
The Ottoman Turkish speaking Muslim inhabitants who came from all parts of the Ottoman Empire, it is said in this source  the islanders who called themselves Turks, were of mixed Turkish, Kurdish, Albanian, and Arabian ancestry. There were also family ties to the Bulgarian Turks of Vidin and Ruse, Bulgaria, due to exogamic marriages, while in this Source, of the Population census from 1913, shows clearly that the majority of the islanders were Turks in the Balkans and Muslim Roma from different parts of the former Rumelia Eyalet, who came after Russo-Turkish War (1877–1878) to the island. The unifying bond was the Turkish language, Turkish culture, and Islam. The population practiced Sufism. The men wore the fez and women the çarşaf until they were forbidden to do so under the Socialist Republic of Romania. The islanders produced lokum (Turkish delight), rose water, and rose oil. They also made a living from tourism, the tobacco industry, and fishery. The island was well known for its Turkish oil wrestling and football team.
During the Second Balkan War in 1913, the island was occupied by the Austro-Hungarian Army, and after World War I in 1919 it was occupied by the Kingdom of Romania. Some Turkish families left the island and went to Istanbul as Muhacir. These occupations were not accepted by the Ottoman Empire in the Treaty of Trianon.
After the Treaty of Lausanne in 1923, the island officially became a part of the Kingdom of Romania. From 1923 to 1938, due to Anti-Turkish sentiment, a lot of Turkish Families from Ada Kaleh and Dobruja went to Turkey. In 1945, some Turks from Ada Kaleh went to Turkey, because they didn't want to live in Socialist Republic of Romania. In 1951, some Turkish Families from Ada Kaleh were forced to settle in the Bărăgan Plain. In 1967, the entire remaining Turkish island population emigrated before the island was flooded. The majority went to Turkey, others settled in Dobruja in Romania. In the period of communism in the 1950s and 1960s, some Romanian, German, and Hungarian women from Orșova married Turkish men from Ada Kaleh.

Notable Persons 
Miskin Baba, was considered the patron Sufi saint by the Turks of Ada Kaleh. Legend says that he was an Uzbek prince from Bukhara, who came to the island around 1786 and died there around 1851. His Türbe was revered as a sanctuary.
Receb Ağa, the Island was ruled by him and his Family from 1788 - 1816.
Around 1860 the German Carl Heinrich Edmund von Berg visit Ada Kaleh and the House of Mahmut Pasha.
Bego Mustafa (Beg (title)), former Corporal from Military of the Ottoman Empire, was a Turk who helped the Hungarian revolutionary Lajos Kossuth escape to Vidin at Ottoman Bulgaria in 1849, across the Danube river on a boat. Bego Mustafa's picture was often used for postcards from Ada Kaleh. He died 1910 with 104 years. He was the last Turkish Feudal Lord of Ada Kaleh.
Other rich Turkish merchants until 1918 were Mehmet Ali, Hayri Salih, Hayri Husseyin, Hayri Ahmet etc. They sold souvenirs or owned cafes, but after 1918 they all left the Island.
Ali Kadri was the richest Turk on Ada Kaleh, he was an orphan and a former Fisherman, later through his cigarette production he became very rich. He was a colorful personality, and was called Sultan of Ada Kaleh. He had a cigarette factory named Musulmana and his cigarettes were well known outside. (...) In the following years, the factory came to manufacture 17 types of cigarettes, as well as other products made in Ada-Kaleh. The company was a gold mine for the islanders. It had branches in Severin and Orsova, concluding contracts at the highest level, even as far as Turkey. The construction of the new buildings at Ada-Kaleh, which stretched from the main alley to the wharf until the war, was due to the initiatives of this company: Power Plant (1934), new houses, four pubs, a restaurant, a hotel (headquarters and for the public library), bakery, a popular bank, a mixed shop, a football field. By 1935, the population had reached about 700 inhabitants (...) Ali Kadri take the Tobacco from Bulgaria. He built a 24-room mansion with a Harem for his four wives, next the Mosque. Around 1945 he fled to Turkey together with his Family, to escape the communist regime in Romania, but his property was confiscated,.

History
The Habsburg monarchy built a Vauban-type fort there to defend it from the Ottoman Empire, and that fort would remain a bone of contention for the two empires. In 1699 the island came under Ottoman control, however, it was recaptured by the Austrians in the 1716–18 war, and the fortress of New Orșova was built by Austrian colonel . After a four-month siege in 1738 it became Ottoman again, followed by the Austrians re-conquering it in 1789, but they had to return the island with the Treaty of Sistova (1791), which ended the 1787–91 war between the Ottoman Empire and the Habsburg monarchy (and, by extension, the Ottoman–Habsburg wars). Ada Kaleh was introduced to the Sanjak of Vidin, who was taken to the Danube vilayet in 1864. Thereafter, the island lost its military importance.

In 1804, during the First Serbian Uprising, Serbian rebels, led by Milenko Stojković, caught and executed the Dahije (renegade Janissary junta in the Sanjak of Smederevo) that had fled Belgrade and taken refuge on the island, thereby ending Dahije tyranny.

Even though the Ottomans lost the areas surrounding the island after the Russo-Turkish War (1877–1878), the biggest problem seen in the social life of the island was the poverty of the 179 Muslim Roma refugees who came from the lost Danube vilayet after 1878, due to the wars, and who did not even have a roof and lived in the Catacombs under the Fortress arches. From a Romanian perspective as the Romanian War of Independence, the island was totally forgotten during the peace talks at the Congress of Berlin in 1878, which allowed it to remain a de jure Ottoman territory and the Ottoman sultan's private possession, although de facto, in 1913, Austria-Hungary unilaterally declared its sovereignty over the island, until the Treaty of Lausanne in 1923.

Between 1878 and 1918 the areas surrounding the island were controlled by Austria-Hungary to the north and Serbia to the south, but the island was under Ottoman sovereignty. The Ottoman Government continued to appoint and send a nahiye müdürü (administrative head of a unit smaller than a district and bigger than a village) and a kadı (judge) regularly. The island's inhabitants (officially citizens of the Ottoman Empire) enjoyed exemption from taxes and customs and were not subject to conscription. The islanders also had the right to vote during the Ottoman general elections of 1908.

On May 12, 1913, taking advantage of the Balkan Wars, dr. Zoltán Medve, the lord-lieutenant of Krassó-Szörény County, sailed to the island under Austro-Hungarian ensign and introduced Hungarian administration by the representation of the Dual Monarchy. The island was transformed into a municipality known as Újorsova and assigned into the Orsova district of Krassó-Szörény County. This was the last territorial expansion of Hungary before the outbreak of the First World War; the seizure was never officially recognised by the Ottoman government.
In the first and only census conducted in 1913, it is recorded in the archive documents that 637 people lived in 171 households in Adakale. Of these, 458 were the resident population living in the island's houses. After the Austro-Hungarian occupation, some Turkish Families left the Island in 1913 and went to Istanbul as Muhacir.

Following the end of World War I, Romania unilaterally declared its sovereignty in 1919 and strengthened its claim with the Treaty of Trianon in 1920, at that time many Turkish Families went to Istanbul as Muhacir. On July 24, 1923, the new Republic of Turkey officially ceded Ada Kaleh to Romania with Articles 25 and 26 of the Treaty of Lausanne; by formally recognising the related provisions in the Treaty of Trianon. From 1923 - 1938, Turkish Families from Ada Kaleh and Dobruja went to Turkey, and settled mostly in East Thrace.

The population lived primarily on the cultivation of tobacco and fishery, and later on tourism. In its last years of existence, the island's population ranged between 600 and 1,000 inhabitants. Before the island was covered by the waters of the Iron Gates Dam, part of the population moved in 1967 to Constanța in Romania and the rest to Turkey, invited by Prime Minister Demirel during his visit to the island.

The Ada Kaleh Mosque with Hammam, dating from 1903, was built on the site of an earlier Franciscan monastery from 1699. The carpet of the mosque, a gift from the Turkish Sultan Abdülhamid II, was relocated to the Constanța Mosque in 1965.

The island was visited by King Carol II of Romania in 1931, and by Prime Minister Süleyman Demirel of Turkey on September 13, 1967.

The Muslim Turkish inhabitants of the island were described by visitors as kindly, friendly, openhearted, with an exotic behaviour, the men were handsome and the women beautiful, they lived peacefully with their Christian neighbors from Orșova.

Aftermath
During the construction of the dam, some of the structures that were built on the island were relocated to the nearby Șimian Island, including part of the masonry of the fortress' catacombs, the mosque, the bazaar, Mahmut Pasha's house, the graveyard, and various other objects. However, the Ada Kaleh community decided to emigrate to Turkey after the evacuation of the island, instead of resettling on Șimian Island. A smaller part went to Dobruja, another Romanian territory with a Turkish minority, so the reconstruction of the "New Ada Kaleh" was never completed.

In literature

Ada Kaleh plays an important part in the novel of one of the most famous Hungarian authors, Mór Jókai. In the novel The Golden Man (Az Arany Ember), published in 1872, Ada Kaleh is called "No One's Isle" and it becomes an almost mythical symbol of peace, seclusion, and beauty, juxtaposed with the material outside world.

In Between the Woods and the Water, the second volume of Patrick Leigh Fermor's narrative of his journey across Europe, the author describes a delightful visit in 1934 with a group of elderly inhabitants and discusses the history of the island.

References
  Philippe Henri Blasen: Mustafa Bego, türkischer Nargileh-Raucher und ungarischer Nationalheld. Nationale Aneignung und internationale Vermarktung der Insel Ada-Kaleh. In: Spiegelungen, 2/2014
 
  Așa a fost pe Ada Kaleh (This is how it was on Ada Kaleh), Jurnalul Național, 7 November 2005
  Supraviețuitorii de pe insula scufundată de Ceaușescu (Survivors of the Island Submerged by Ceaușescu), Evenimentul Zilei 21 October 2006
  Ada Kaleh
 The Old Island of Ada Kaleh 
 The Rebuilding of Ada Kaleh on Șimian Island

Notes

External links
 Ada Kaleh, an Ottoman Atlantis on the Danube
 Ada-Kaleh: the Balkan Island Where People Once Lived with no State or Masters, Petar Georgiev Mandzhukov's memoir Harbingers of Storm (Sofia: FAB, 2013)
 Ada Kaleh: the lost island of the Danube - photogallery

Forced migration
Former islands
Geographic history of Romania
Islam in Romania
Islands of the Danube
River islands of Romania
River islands of Serbia
Turkish communities outside Turkey
Former populated places in Romania
Hungary under Habsburg rule
Former exclaves
Romania–Turkey relations